Glenea weigeli is a species of beetle in the family Cerambycidae. It was described by Lin and Liu in 2012.

References

weigeli
Beetles described in 2012